The Sam Davis House (also known as the Sam Davis Home) is a historic house in Smyrna, Tennessee. It is now a museum to the memory of Confederate soldier Sam Davis.

History
The house was first built as a log house in 1810, and remodelled by Charles Davis in 1847. His son, Sam Davis, who became known as the "Boy Hero of the Confederacy", grew up in this house.

The house was acquired by the State of Tennessee in 1927, and turned into a house museum for its association with Sam Davis by the Sam Davis Historical Association in 1930. Edith Pope, the second editor of the Confederate Veteran, donated an antique bed and clock as well as a large photograph of Sumner Archibald Cunningham to the museum.

Architectural significance
The porch was designed in the Greek Revival architectural style. The house has been listed on the National Register of Historic Places since December 23, 1969.

Notable Events

The site hosts a yearly victorian Halloween event along with seasonal ghost tours.

Gallery

References

External links

Official website

Houses on the National Register of Historic Places in Tennessee
Greek Revival architecture in Tennessee
Houses completed in 1810
Historic house museums in Tennessee
Buildings and structures in Rutherford County, Tennessee